Pedro del Hierro (October 3, 1948 - April 3, 2015)  was a Spanish fashion designer.

References

1948 births
2015 deaths
Spanish fashion designers